Isaac Newell (24 April 1853 – 16 October 1907) was an English teacher who pioneered football in Argentina. He was the founder of both the Colegio Comercial Anglicano Argentino and the football club Newell's Old Boys, which is named in his honour.

Leaving England

Isaac Newell was born on 24 April 1853 in Strood, Kent, England to Joseph Newell and Mary Goodger. Growing up, he had an adventurous spirit and a passion for sporting activities, especially football.

At the age of 16 he boarded a ship to Argentina with some friends of his father. When he arrived in the city of Rosario he presented a letter of recommendation from his father to William Wheelwright, the administrator of the British-owned Central Argentine Railway. Wheelwright gave him a job as a telegraphist.

In 1876 he married his wife Anna Jockinsen, and in 1876 his first son Claudio was born, followed later by Liliana, Fortinato and Margarita.

Colegio Comercial Anglicano Argentino

Newell acquired a property and in 1884 he founded the Colegio Comercial Anglicano Argentino with a distinctive red and black colour scheme with emblem. The colours were a mixture from the flags of England and the flag of the German Empire, Anna's nationality.

It was in 1884 that the first football and set of rules arrived in Argentina. Newell decided to alternate study at the college with sporting activity. Over the years the sport gained in popularity at the college.

In 1900 Newell made his son Claudio and his daughter-in-law, Katie Cowell, directors of the school.

Newell's Old Boys

Club Atlético Newell's Old Boys was founded on 3 November 1903. Claudio Newell was one of the principal founders.

The club was founded for teachers, students and alumni of the college, and was named in homage to Newell's life and achievements. The club's emblem and their kit take their colours from the Colegio Comercial Anglicano Argentino.

References

1853 births
1907 deaths
People from Strood
Schoolteachers from Kent
English emigrants to Argentina
Newell's Old Boys
Argentine schoolteachers